Camille Tan Hojilla (born May 1, 1997), known professionally as Miles Ocampo, is a Filipino actress, model, writer, and singer. A former mainstay in the kiddie gag show Goin' Bulilit, she is a member of Crown Artist Management, a talent agency founded by Maja Salvador. Previously, she was under Star Magic from 2004 to 2022.

Her best Known for television as Camille Sarmiento in youth-oriented comedy Luv U from February 2012 to January 2016 and Gigi in Sitcom Home Sweetie Home since January 2014.
Next, for Primetime Series includes Kailangan Ko'y Ikaw as Precious in 2013, And I Love You So as Joanna in 2015–2016 and Sana Dalawa ang Puso as Tinay in 2018.

Career
Miles Ocampo was born as Camille Tan Hojilla on May 1, 1997. At young age, she first appeared in the teleseries Krystala as Balding, followed by Mangarap Ka which starred Piolo Pascual and Angelica Panganiban. She also starred in Mga Anghel Na Walang Langit and a number of Star Cinema films including I've Fallen for You (as Kim Chiu's sister), A Very Special Love (AVSL), You Changed My Life, BFF: Best Friends Forever, and Paano Na Kaya, a film By Kim Chiu and Gerald Anderson via Star Cinema.

Education
Ocampo currently attends University of the Philippines, studying Malikhaing Pagsulat.

Discography

Filmography

Awards and nominations

References

External links

1997 births
Living people
Filipino child singers
Filipino child actresses
Filipino film actresses
Filipino television actresses
ABS-CBN personalities
Star Magic
TV5 (Philippine TV network) personalities
GMA Network personalities
21st-century Filipino singers
21st-century Filipino women singers
Actresses from Quezon
Filipino people of Chinese descent
Filipino television variety show hosts